Tomislav Mrkonjić (born 22 February 1994) is a Croatian professional footballer who plays as a midfielder for Eerste Divisie club PEC Zwolle.

Career

Mrkonjić played with Imotski from 2015 to 2016, on loan from RNK Split, and made 29 appearances in the Croatian Second League over the course of two seasons.

During the 2016–17 season, Mrkonjić returned to play for his hometown club, Croatia Zmijavci, a team in the Croatian Third League. He was proclaimed as the best player of the first half of the season, in which Mrkonjić scored 11 goals and made 13 assists in 16 appearances.

In July 2018 he joined Croatian top division side Rudeš to help them in relegation battle. His first goals came in round 2 against Osijek, where he scored a brace in a 3–2 defeat.

In February 2020 he returned to Croatia Zmijavci, who were newly promoted to the second division.

Mrkonjić joined Dutch Eerste Divisie club PEC Zwolle on 6 July 2022, signing a two-year contract with an option for an additional year.

References

External links
 

1994 births
Living people
Footballers from Split, Croatia
Association football midfielders
Croatian footballers
RNK Split players
NK Imotski players
NK Croatia Zmijavci players
HNK Hajduk Split II players
NK Rudeš players
NK Radomlje players
PEC Zwolle players
First Football League (Croatia) players
Croatian Football League players
Second Football League (Croatia) players
Slovenian PrvaLiga players
Eerste Divisie players
Croatian expatriate footballers
Croatian expatriate sportspeople in Slovenia
Expatriate footballers in Slovenia
Croatian expatriate sportspeople in the Netherlands
Expatriate footballers in the Netherlands